Veronica Margarita Cintron, also known as Veronica Rudie by her married name, is the current vice president of communications at Tampa International Airport. She was the prime time Monday-Friday solo anchor on Bay News 9 television news station, serving the Tampa Bay area from 2010-2020. Veronica was born in Puerto Rico in 1983. Veronica was named in the Tampa Bay 40 Under 40 honorees in  2022. She was infected with Covid-19 in 2020. Veronica & her husband Preston Rudie hosted the pre-show interviews of the Suncoast Emmy Awards. Veronica was nominated for 6 Emmy Awards in 2019. Veronica serves on the Tampa Bay Chamber of Commerce & has been known to frequent the White House easter egg roll with her daughter. Veronica wants to become an ambassador of a sovereign state for the US.

See also
 List of Puerto Ricans
 List of Stateside Puerto Ricans

References

External links
 Veronica Cintron on Bay News 9
 Veronica Cintron Tampa Bay Chamber of Commerce
 Ragan; Veronica Cintron

Year of birth missing (living people)
Living people
American journalists of Puerto Rican descent
Puerto Rican television journalists
21st-century American journalists
Television anchors from Tampa, Florida
American women television journalists